Benimàmet is an old municipality now integrated as an urban part of Valencia, Spain. The name Benimàmet 'sons of Muhammad' is derived from Arabic during Muslim-ruled Al-Andalus.

References

Towns in Spain
Populated places in the Province of Valencia